Drill 'n' bass is a subgenre of drum and bass which developed in the mid-1990s as IDM artists began experimenting with elements of breakbeat, jungle, and drum and bass music. Artists utilized powerful audio software programs and deployed frenzied, irregular beats that often discouraged dancing. The style was often interpreted as having a lightly parodic relationship with the dance styles that inspired it.

Characteristics
AllMusic referred to the genre as "a spastic form of breakbeat jungle that relied on powerful audio software and patient programming to warp old midtempo beats and breaks into a frenzied, experimental potpourri of low-attention-span electronic music." Critic Simon Reynolds described it as "jungle by non-junglists for non-junglists," stating that producers are "free to take the idiomatic features of jungle — fucked-up breakbeats, mutant bass, sampladelic collage —and exacerbate them away beyond any conceivable use-value to DJ or dancer." Author Peter Shapiro called it "double-time drum 'n' bass with impossible-to-dance-to rhythms and toilet humor."

History
Early exponents of drill 'n' bass included Luke Vibert, Aphex Twin, and Squarepusher. The style was pioneered by Vibert on his 1995 EPs under the name Plug. Other pioneering releases included Aphex Twin's Hangable Auto Bulb EP (1995) (under his AFX moniker) and Squarepusher's Conumber E:P EP (1995). In 1996, the style appeared on long-form LPs such as Plug's Drum 'n' Bass for Papa and Squarepusher's Feed Me Weird Things. Subsequent artists like Witchman, Animals on Wheels, Amon Tobin, Mung, and Plasmalamp also explored the style.

By the end of the 1990s, it had largely dissipated. Subsequent artists such as Kid606 drew on the style. It would help produce the IDM spin-off genre breakcore, which took a more earnest and frenetic approach to the jungle sound.

See also
Intelligent dance music
Jungle
Drum and bass
Glitch (music)

References

Drum and bass subgenres
English styles of music